The Sussex Senior Cup is an annual association football knock-out cup competition for men's football clubs in the English county of Sussex and is the county senior cup of the Sussex FA.  Its official name is the Sussex Senior Challenge Cup.  For sponsorship purposes, from 2012 to 2018 it is also known as the Parafix Sussex Senior Cup after a new three-year sponsorship deal was agreed in 2015.

First played in the 1882–83 season, shortly after the founding of the Sussex County Football Association in 1882, the first winners of the cup were Brighton Rangers. Other teams who won the cup in its early history are Burgess Hill, Lancing College and Eastbourne.

The team with most title wins in the competition's history are Worthing but Sussex's sole Premier League team, Brighton & Hove Albion, have been most successful in recent years. Bognor Regis Town won the competition a record five times in succession between 1980 and 1984.

Winners also qualify for a place in the Sussex FA Community Shield match, traditionally the opening match each season in Sussex football. Brighton & Hove Albion are the current holders of the Sussex Senior Cup, having beaten Worthing 4-2 in the 2022 final.

History

Shortly after the Sussex County Football Association was founded in 1882 the inaugural competition of the Sussex Senior Club took place for the 1882–83 season.  Brighton Rangers won the final of the first competition 3–0. Founder members of Sussex County FA include the public schools of Lancing College, Brighton College and Ardingly College and their old-boy teams dominated the cup early on, along with clubs such as Burgess Hill and Eastbourne, whose teams were made up of upper and middle class players.

The cup was initially contested only by amateur clubs.  At the time Sussex's only professional club, Brighton & Hove Albion tried to enter the competition in 1905 but had to withdraw because of clashing dates.  Albion won the Sussex Wartime Cup in 1943 but only entered the normal competition in 1946.  Albion entered the competition again in 1975-76 following the abolition of the distinction between amateur and professional clubs in the English game.

Following the 1913–14 competition, the cup was suspended due to the First World War, and resumed in 1919–20.  During the Second World War the winners of the Sussex Wartime Cup were awarded the Sussex Senior Cup.  The Sussex Wartime Cup took place on a league basis and a competition was held in every year during the Second World War except for 1940-41 when no competition for the Sussex Senior Cup was held.

Under Jack Pearce, Bognor Regis Town dominated the Sussex Senior Cup in the 1980s, winning the cup six times, including a record five times in succession, and finishing runners-up once.

From 1950 to 1951 the cup final took place at the Goldstone Ground every year until 1995 when Brighton sold their ground to developers.  A crowd of over 7,000, the cup's highest attendance in recent years, saw the 2010–11 season final take place at Brighton's new Falmer Stadium on 16 July 2011.  It was the first competitive match to be played there. Brighton won the game 2–0 with Gary Hart scoring the first ever goal at the new ground. The cup final has taken place there every year since 2011.

Eligibility
The Sussex Senior Cup is open to all men's senior clubs in the historic county of Sussex that are affiliated to the Sussex County Football Association.  In 2016–17 this was 50 clubs that play in the top ten tiers of the English football league system (Premier League, English Football League, National League, National League South, Isthmian League, Southern Combination Football League Premier Division, Southern Combination Football League Division One and Southern Counties East Premier Division).

Competition format

Overview
Beginning in September, the competition proceeds as a knockout tournament throughout its duration, consisting of three rounds, then quarter-finals, semi-finals and final, usually in May.  A system of byes ensures that the highest placed 14 clubs in Sussex enter the competition in the second round.  For reasons of fairness to other clubs, the Brighton & Hove Albion's and Crawley Town's  under-21 teams compete in the Sussex Senior Cup since, as full time professional squads, their first teams play many levels of the football league pyramid ahead of other teams.

Distribution
The tournament is organised so that 32 clubs remain by the second round. 31 clubs in the Southern Combination League Premier Division and Division One (tiers 9 and 10 of the English football league system) and one club from the Wessex Premier Division (tier 9) enter in the first round. 

In the second round, Bognor Regis Town, Brighton & Hove Albion, Burgess Hill Town, Chichester City, Crawley Town, East Grinstead Town, Eastbourne Borough, Hastings United, Haywards Heath Town, Horsham, Lancing, Lewes, Littlehampton Town, Three Bridges, Whitehawk and Worthing, all receive a bye to the second round.

 Professional clubs from the Premier League and the English Football League can only enter an Under-21 or an Under-23 team to keep fairness to non-professional clubs.

Qualification for subsequent competitions

Sussex Community Shield
The winners of the Sussex Senior Cup traditionally play the winners of the Sussex County Football League (since 2015-2016 the Southern Combination Football League) for the Sussex Community Shield (also known as the Sussex County FA Community Shield.  The 2019 competition saw Chichester City, the winners of the 2018−19 SCFL play Bognor Regis Town, the winners of the 2018−19 Sussex Senior Cup.  Bognor won the 2019 Sussex Community Shield 1−0 with a goal from Dan Smith.

Winners and finalists

1883-1900

1901-1945

Post-1945 winners

Venues

For rounds before the semi-final stage, the venue of each match is determined when the fixtures are drawn; the first club drawn in a fixture is usually the home team and matches are played at the club's home ground.  The semi-finals are played at a neutral venue, usually at the Sussex FA at Culver Road in Lancing.

The final of the Sussex Senior Cup was held at Preston Park in Brighton for the first four competitions, from 1883 to 1886.  It was then held at the County Cricket Ground in Hove for 18 editions of the cup, with the exception of the 1891 season, which was held on a league basis.  In 1906 the first cup final took place to have been played at the Goldstone Ground in Hove.  At the time the Goldstone Ground was the home stadium of Brighton and Hove Albion, which for some time was Sussex's only professional football club.  The Goldstone Ground was known to have hosted the final of the Sussex Senior Cup a record 55 times between 1906 and 1995.  Other stadiums to have hosted the Susssex Senior Cup include The Dripping Pan in Lewes (held 14 times between 1920 and 1947), The Trafalgar Ground in Newhaven (held twice in 1931 and 1932), Woodside Road in Worthing (held 7 times between 1934 and 1997), The Saffrons in Eastbourne (held once in 1936), Queen Street in Horsham (held once in 1949), Broadfield Stadium in Crawley (held twice in 1998 and 1999) and Priory Lane in Eastbourne (held 11 times between 2000 and 2010).  Since 2011 the final of the Sussex Senior Cup has been played at the Falmer Stadium in Brighton.

Records
 Most wins: 21:
 Worthing (1893, 1904, 1908, 1914, 1920, 1923, 1927, 1929, 1935, 1940, 1945, 1946, 1947, 1952, 1957, 1959, 1961, 1975, 1977, 1978, 1999)
 Most consecutive wins: 5
 Bognor Regis Town (1980, 1981, 1982, 1983, 1984)
 Most appearances in a final: 31
 Worthing
 Most consecutive appearances in a final: 6
 Bognor Regis Town (1980, 1981, 1982, 1983, 1984, 1985)
 Most defeats in a final: 13
 Lewes
 Biggest win: 7 goals:
 Eastbourne 7-0 Hastings and St Leonards (1903)
 Most goals in final: 11:
 Southwick 8-3 Haywards Heath (1937)

Statistics

Performance by club

Total cups won by town or city
34 different clubs have won the cup, and the majority of cups have been won by clubs from Brighton and Hove, Eastbourne and Worthing.

See also
 Sussex RUR Cup
 Sport in Sussex

References

External links
 The Senior Cup page on the Sussex FA's official website

County Cup competitions
Football in Sussex
Recurring sporting events established in 1883